Ralph Douglas Townsend (born 13 December 1951, in Nedlands, West Australia) is an educational consultant. He was Chairman of  Prep Schools Trust (2017-2022) and Special Adviser to the President of Keio University and President of Keio Academy of New York (2017-2021).  He currently serves on the International Development Group of the Jesuit Refugee Service. He was Headmaster of Winchester College (2005-2016). He was previously Headmaster of Oundle School (1999-2005) and before that Headmaster of Sydney Grammar School (1989-1999).

Career

After brief teaching appointments at Dover College and Abingdon School, he proceeded to further study at Oxford University. He was first Senior Scholar at Keble College of Oxford University, then a Junior Research Fellow, Tutor and Dean of Degrees at Lincoln College, where he was the Anglican chaplain. He resigned from this post in 1985 when he decided to join the Roman Catholic Church.

He took up a teaching post at Eton College in 1985. He left as Head of Personal Education in 1989 to become Headmaster of Sydney Grammar School. While in Sydney, Townsend was Patron of the Australian Musicians' Academy and President of the New South Wales Classical Association. After ten years in that post, he returned to England to become Headmaster of Oundle School. In 2005 he was appointed Headmaster of Winchester, the first Roman Catholic to hold that post since the Reformation. In 2011 he was invested a Knight of the Order of the Holy Sepulchre of Jerusalem.
 
He has written books, articles and reviews in the areas of church history, westerns, religious literature and education.

He has been a Governor of Terra Nova School (Cheshire) 1999–2003, Old Buckenham Hall School (Suffolk) 1999–2006, Ardvreck School (Crieff, Scotland) 2000–2005, Ampleforth College (North Yorkshire) 2003–2006, Bramcote Lorne School (Nottinghamshire) 2003–2005, Mowden Hall School (Northumberland) 2000–2007, Worth School (West Sussex) 2004-2010 and 2016–2019, The Pilgrims' School Winchester 2005–2013, St Swithun's School Winchester 2005–2013, St John's School Beaumont 2007-2016 and Charterhouse School 2016–2019. From 2005 to 2011 he was a Trustee of the United Church Schools Trust and an adviser to the United Learning Trust. From 2008 to 2016 he was a Governor of Midhurst Rother College and from 2014 to 2019 a Trustee of St George's House Windsor Castle. He was a governor of UWC Dilijan College 2008–2018.

References

External links

 Winchester College Website: The Headmaster

University of Western Australia alumni
Alumni of the University of Kent
People educated at Scotch College, Perth
Australian headmasters
Sydney Grammar School headmasters
Headmasters of Winchester College
Fellows of Lincoln College, Oxford
Living people
1951 births
Knights of the Holy Sepulchre
Headmasters of Oundle School
Staff of Abingdon School
Teachers at Eton College